The Skala Battalion is a Ukrainian military intelligence volunteer unit formed by Yuriy Harkaviy, whose nickname ″Skala″ gave the unit its name. It has partaken in operations in the 2022 Russian invasion of Ukraine such as assaults on enemy positions and using aerial drones to hunt Russian soldiers, having success in the 2022 Kharkiv counteroffensive working with the 93rd Mechanized Brigade.

Harkaviy initially formed the unit by recruiting men of similar spirit and supplying them with steady supplies, starting off by ambushing Russian tank columns. Members of the Skala Battalion wear badges emblazoned with two antitank weapons and a drone. Using their drones the unit looks for targets to report to friendly headquarters, who then relay the information to artillery gunners who themselves can use the drones to correct their fire on enemy positions.

History
The Skala Battalion has taken part in the defence of Bakhmut, being in the immediate vicinity when a Russian Sukhoi Su-24 was shot down.

See also 
 Kraken Regiment

References 

Battalions of Ukraine
Volunteer military formations of Ukraine
Military units and formations of the 2022 Russian invasion of Ukraine